Azure is a locality within the Foothills County in the Calgary Region, of Alberta, Canada.

See also 
List of communities in Alberta

References 

Localities in Foothills County